Warpath is a 1951 American Western film directed by Byron Haskin and starring Edmond O'Brien, Polly Bergen and Dean Jagger. The film was released as a Fawcett Comics Film #9 in August 1951.

Plot
John Vickers has spent eight years hunting for the three men who murdered the woman he loved. He finds one, Woodson, and kills him in a gunfight, but not before learning that the other two men have joined the U.S. Cavalry.

En route to North Dakota, where Vickers plans to join the men under the command of George Armstrong Custer to continue his search, he sees a sergeant named O'Hara physically manhandling a woman. Molly Quade is grateful for his intervention, but O'Hara gets even when Vickers ends up serving under him at the fort, giving him the most unpleasant duties.

Molly has come to the fort to help her father Sam Quade run a general store. He is opposed to her attraction to Vickers. On an assignment, soldiers are badly outnumbered by a band of Sioux until being rescued by Custer and his troops. Vickers is recognized by Custer as a former Union officer and is promoted to first sergeant.

O'Hara realizes that Vickers suspects him to be one of the killers of his fiancée. An ambush attempt fails, so he deserts the Army and flees. A wagon train is formed to evacuate civilians while Custer prepares to do battle at Little Big Horn, but along the way, Molly, her father and Vickers are taken captive. O'Hara is a prisoner, too, and when he learns Custer's men will be hopelessly outnumbered and slaughtered, he tries to go warn the general and sacrifices his own life, distracting the Sioux until the others can escape.

Molly becomes aware that Sam, her father, is the third killer Vickers has been seeking. Before she can persuade Vickers not to kill him, Sam rides off to warn Custer, which will certainly lead to his own death.

Cast
Edmond O'Brien as John Vickers
Dean Jagger as Sam Quade
Forrest Tucker as Sgt. O'Hara
Harry Carey Jr. as Capt. Gregson
Polly Bergen as Molly Quade
James Millican as Lt Col George Armstrong Custer 
Wallace Ford as Pvt. 'Irish' Potts 
Paul Fix as Pvt. Fiore 
Louis Jean Heydt as Herb Woodson  
Chief Yowlachie as Chief  
Walter Sande as Sgt. Parker 
Charles Dayton as Lt. Nelson 
Robert Bray as Maj. Comstock 
Monte Blue as First Emigrant  
John Hart as Sgt. Plennert
Ethan Laidlaw as Trooper (uncredited)

References

External links

1951 films
1951 Western (genre) films
American Western (genre) films
Western (genre) cavalry films
Paramount Pictures films
Films directed by Byron Haskin
Films adapted into comics
Cultural depictions of George Armstrong Custer
Films scored by Paul Sawtell
1950s English-language films
1950s American films